The Embassy of Russia in Vienna is the diplomatic mission of the Russian Federation to the Republic of Austria. The chancery is located at Reisnerstraße 45-47 in the Landstraße district of Vienna.

History of the chancery 

The building which is now the embassy chancery was built in 1872–73 based upon the designs of architect Alois Wurm-Arnkreuz in Viennese Neo-Renaissance style. The façade of the building features an open balcony and a balustrade. The colonnade, stairs and interior are made of granite and marble.

In 1874 the palace was handed to the Duke of Nassau and was acquired in 1891 by Prince Aleksey Lobanov-Rostovsky, the ambassador of the Russian Empire in Vienna at the time for use of the Russian mission. The palace later housed diplomatic representatives of the Soviet Union.

During the Vienna Offensive in 1945, the building suffered damage and was restored during 1947 and 1950. The chancery hosted a meeting between Nikita Khrushchev and John F. Kennedy in 1961 and was the site of meetings between Leonid Brezhnev and Jimmy Carter which led to the signing on 18 June 1979 of the historic SALT II agreement.

As of 2022 embassy building is being used by diplomatic mission of the Russian Federation, but its legal ownership is disputed between Russia and Ukraine.

Education
The Russian Embassy School in Vienna is a part of the institution.

See also  
 Austria–Russia relations
 List of Ambassadors of Russia to Austria

References

External links 
 
 

Buildings and structures in Landstraße
Austria–Russia relations
Austria–Soviet Union relations
Russia
Vienna
Houses completed in 1873
Palaces in Vienna